Barbana is a small island located at the northern end of the Grado Lagoon, near Trieste in north-east Italy. It is the site of the Santuario di Barbana, an ancient Marian shrine, whose origins date back to 582 when Elia, the Patriarch of Aquileia, built a church near the hut of a hermit from Treviso named Barbanus. The island, which can be easily reached by ferry from nearby Grado, is populated by a small community of Franciscan friars.

History of the shrine

The foundation of the shrine originates from an image of the Virgin Mary carried in by the sea and found at the foot of an elm after a fierce storm. At that time the site was part of the mainland; the Grado Lagoon was formed between the 5th and 7th centuries.

From the foundation to around 1000, Barbana became an island and  the shrine was served by a community of monks unique to the island, called the Barbitani. The original church was destroyed by floods and rebuilt. The image of Mary, too, was lost and in the 11th century was replaced by a wooden statue known as the Madonna mora. This Black Madonna is now housed in the Domus Mariae (House of Mary), a chapel near the main church.

In the 11th century, the care of the shrine was entrusted to Benedictine monks, who served there until the 15th century. They were succeeded by a Franciscan community who built a new church in the 18th century.

Art and architecture

The modern church was built in the Romanesque style at the beginning of the 20th century. Ancient remains include two Roman columns from the first church, and a 10th-century relief portraying Jesus. The crowned statue of Mary dates from the 15th century, while the 17th century is represented by several altars and paintings, including one from the school of Tintoretto.

In the wood near the church a small chapel (the Cappella dell'apparizione) was built in 1854 in the place where the original image of Mary was found.

The baptismal font of the church is supported by a figure of the Devil, sculpted in red marble. It is the work of Claudio Granzotto, a Franciscan friar and noted religious artist of the mid-20th century. He has been beatified by the Catholic Church and is being considered for canonization.

Pilgrimages
Barbana is the destination of many pilgrimages, the most famous being the Perdon de Barbana which is held each July to celebrate the end of a visitation of the plague in Grado in 1237.

See also
 List of islands of Italy
Grado
Shrines to the Virgin Mary

References 

 ‘Barbana’, Frati Minori del Veneto e Friuli.

Islands of the Adriatic Sea
Catholic pilgrimage sites
Shrines to the Virgin Mary
Churches in the province of Gorizia
Islands of Friuli-Venezia Giulia